John Delaney (born 16 October 1967) is a former Irish sports administrator. He was the Chief Executive Officer of the Football Association of Ireland from March 2005 to March 2019, and its Executive Vice President from March to September. He agreed to a voluntary suspension of all duties in September 2019 following journalistic investigation into the financial management of the Association.

Life
Born in Waterford, John Delaney is one of five children of Joe and Joan Delaney. His siblings are a brother, Paul, and three sisters, Joanne, Jane and Mary Pat. His family were removed to County Tipperary when he was about three, and he grew up later in Tipperary Town.  As a schoolboy he played Gaelic games as well as soccer, and lined out for St Michaels of Tipperary and Tralee Celtic of Kerry.

Business life
Delaney's early career was in business, beginning with a bakery in Tralee, and by 2002 he owned three companies in Waterford and had other business interests in Athlone.  He sold a logistics business in 2002.

After studies at Waterford IT, Delaney qualified as a chartered accountant but as of September 2016 had not gone through the formality of joining Chartered Accountants Ireland (CAI).

Soccer administration
John Delaney joined the board of directors of soccer club Waterford United in 1996, in which capacity he represented the club on the Football Association of Ireland (FAI) Senior Council, and in the League of Ireland.

He was elected Treasurer of the FAI in July 2001, the youngest man to hold the position. His father, Joe, had held the same position previously.

CEO and the Aviva Stadium
Delaney rose to prominence in the wake of the 2002 Keane Saipan saga, having emerged as the FAI's public figurehead during the affair. He became acting chief executive of the organisation in December 2004, after Fran Rooney's acrimonious departure,  and took up the role full-time in March 2005. In November 2006, his contract was extended to 2012. In July 2010, the FAI's Board of Directors agreed to extend his contract again, until 2015, and in July 2014 once more, this time to 2019.

The biggest project undertaken during Delaney's time in office was the expansion of the Irish Rugby Football Union stadium at Lansdowne Road to become the Aviva Stadium.  Led by the IRFU with the active participation of the FAI, the project successfully delivered the stadium but while the State and the IRFU parts were financially as planned, the FAI found itself in severe debt.  The main scheme to pay for the FAI elements of the work, the Vantage Club for high-income fans, massively under-delivered on advance ticket sales, partly due to the declining economic climate after the Irish financial crisis and partially to the over-pricing of the ticket offering.

Handball incident and aftermath
When FIFA offered Ireland a Fair Play Award following 2009's France v Republic of Ireland play-off, Delaney respectfully declined and said FIFA President Sepp Blatter was "an embarrassment to himself and an embarrassment to FIFA".

On 4 June 2015, it was revealed by Delaney that FIFA had paid the FAI €5m to stop legal action against them after their controversial World Cup play-off defeat in 2009.

2012–2017
In 2012 Delaney cut all FAI staff wages by 10% and announced he would do the same with his wages. However, in March 2019 it emerged that the FAI had awarded him a benefit-in-kind payment of €3,000 a month towards a house in Kilmacanogue, rented from Grainne Seoige. This outraged the staff as he already earned more than €300,000 annually more than most of them.

In 2012 the Republic of Ireland qualified for their first European Championship since 1988, under Giovanni Trapatoni, and in 2016 they also qualified for the same championship in France, under Martin O Neill, and advanced to the last 16 of the tournament.

Delaney was elected to the executive committee of UEFA in April 2017.

2019
In late March 2019 the FAI announced that Delaney had resigned as CEO, and would take up a specially-created new position of Executive Vice-president, reporting directly to the Board rather than the CEO, and with responsibility, among other things, for international affairs.

On 10 April 2019, Delaney was part of an FAI delegation appearing before the Oireachtas Committee on Sport, but after reading a prepared statement, declined to take questions or speak further.

Delaney remained on full pay in his new role until 28 September, when the FAI announced that he had resigned from the role of Executive Vice-president and all FAI roles, with immediate effect.

Delaney resigned his UEFA executive committee membership in January 2020.

Other roles
Delaney became a member of the executive committee of the Olympic Council of Ireland in 2005.  He was re-elected unopposed as Second Vice-president of the OCI in 2008.  He resigned from the executive committee and from his position as the Second Vice-president of the OCI on 25 October 2016.  Prior to this, he had been seen as heir apparent to OCI president Pat Hickey.

Delaney is also a member of the board of directors of the Aviva Stadium.

He was elected to the executive committee of UEFA at the Helsinki Congress on 5 April 2017.

National team managers
Delaney has overseen the appointments of Steve Staunton, Giovanni Trapattoni, Martin O'Neill and Mick McCarthy to manage the Republic of Ireland national football team.

Personal life
Delaney was married to a Clare woman, Emer, who was a secondary school teacher in Tipperary Town; they have twins, Thomas and Eve. Divorce proceedings commenced in 2016. In 2017, he became engaged to model Emma English, after some years in a relationship. As of 2022, Delaney has been UK-resident for some years.  His mother died in August 2022, and at her funeral he mentioned the birth of a further daughter with his new partner, Natalia.

References

1967 births
Sportspeople from Waterford (city)
Alumni of Dublin Institute of Technology
Irish businesspeople
Football Association of Ireland officials
Olympic Federation of Ireland officials
Living people